Pyrgotis calligypsa is a species of moth of the family Tortricidae. It is endemic to New Zealand.

Description

The wingspan is about 16 mm. The forewings are white, with a grey basal patch with some strigulae (fine streaks) consisting of blackish irroration (speckling) and suffused with white towards the costa. The hindwings are whitish, with small scattered light-grey spots or strigulae.

References

	

Moths described in 1926
Archipini
Moths of New Zealand
Endemic fauna of New Zealand
Taxa named by Edward Meyrick
Endemic moths of New Zealand